In enzymology, a 2-methylacyl-CoA dehydrogenase is an enzyme that catalyzes the chemical reaction

2-methylbutanoyl-CoA + acceptor  2-methylbut-2-enoyl-CoA + reduced acceptor

Thus, the two substrates of this enzyme are 2-methylbutanoyl-CoA and acceptor, whereas its two products are 2-methylbut-2-enoyl-CoA and reduced acceptor.

This enzyme belongs to the family of oxidoreductases, specifically those acting on the CH-CH group of donor with other acceptors.  The systematic name of this enzyme class is 2-methylbutanoyl-CoA:acceptor oxidoreductase. Other names in common use include branched-chain acyl-CoA dehydrogenase, 2-methyl branched chain acyl-CoA dehydrogenase, and 2-methylbutanoyl-CoA:(acceptor) oxidoreductase.  This enzyme participates in valine, leucine and isoleucine degradation.

References

 

EC 1.3.99
Enzymes of unknown structure